Frank Boateng (born August 17, 1984, in Accra, Ghana) is a Ghanaian footballer who played for Al Egtmaaey Tripoli.

Club career
He began his career in the youth from Zamama F.C. and joined on 6 November 2008 to new promoted Ghana Premier League club Sporting Mirren. After his successful season with Sporting Mirren left Boateng the club on 13 October 2009 to sign with Asante Kotoko.

International career 
Boateng was called up for the Ghana national football team for the friendly game on 1 October 2009 against Argentina national football team and played in the game his debut.

References

External links
 

1984 births
Living people
Ghanaian footballers
Association football midfielders
Footballers from Accra
Asante Kotoko S.C. players
Zaytuna F.C. players
Sporting Saint Mirren F.C. players
Expatriate footballers in Lebanon
Ghanaian expatriate footballers
Ghanaian expatriate sportspeople in Lebanon
Lebanese Premier League players
Al Egtmaaey SC players
Ghana international footballers